The Watson House is a historic house at 300 N. Cherry Street in Hamburg, Arkansas.  The two story Colonial Revival brick house was built in 1918, and features verandas on its street-facing elevations.  The verandas are supported by large Ionic columns that rise two full stories to support the roof, with the second floor veranda supported by cables suspended from above.  The large-proportioned house is one of the most prominent buildings in Hamburg.  It was designed and built by W. C. Bunn for David Watson, owner of a successful local hardware store.

The house was listed on the National Register of Historic Places in 1977. It now houses the Ashley County Museum.

See also
National Register of Historic Places listings in Ashley County, Arkansas

References

External links
Ashley County Museum

Houses on the National Register of Historic Places in Arkansas
Neoclassical architecture in Arkansas
Houses completed in 1918
Houses in Ashley County, Arkansas
Museums in Ashley County, Arkansas
National Register of Historic Places in Ashley County, Arkansas
1918 establishments in Arkansas
Hamburg, Arkansas